Malfrida (died 1000) was probably the Bohemian wife of the grand prince of Kiev Vladimir I of Kiev.

Primary Chronicle mentioned about a death of woman named Malfrida. Russian historian Vasily Tatishchev supposed that Malfrida was a Bohemian wife of Vladimir I of Kiev.

Other historians supposed that Malfrida was identical to Malusha.

Probable children
Malfrida may have bore two sons to Vladimir I of Kiev:
Svyatoslav of Smolensk (d. 1015)
Mstislav of Chernigov (d. 1036) - probably his mother was Rogneda of Polotsk.

Sources
Primary Chronicle

|-

|-

Kievan Rus' princesses
1000 deaths
Year of birth unknown
10th-century Rus' people
10th-century Rus' women
Wives of Vladimir the Great